Faisal ibn Turki may refer to:

 Faisal ibn Turki ibn Abdullah Al Saud, one of the imams of the Second Saudi State
 Faisal bin Turki, Sultan of Muscat and Oman